Eirian Smith is an American female acrobatic gymnast. With Brian Kincher, she competed in the 2014 Acrobatic Gymnastics World Championships.

References 

1998 births
Living people
American acrobatic gymnasts
Female acrobatic gymnasts
21st-century American women